Wale Fanu (21 April 1950 – 12 June 2022), popularly known as Uncle Wales, was a veteran TV and Film producer and one of the few septuagenarians with sickle cell anaemia.

Early life and career 
Wale Fanu was born into Fanu family in Lagos State Nigeria and he attended St. Paul's College Zaria. He was the third child of the family, and the only one with sickle cell anaemia. He forwent his admission to be a pilot  and also withdrew out of Technical College (now The Polytechnic), Ibadan as an Electrical Engineering student because of the adversities of the ailment. Eventually, he picked up  a job at film laboratory in Ikoyi and eventually become a veteran film producer and the CEO of CINECRAFT.

References 

2022 deaths
Nigerian film producers
Nigerian television producers
1952 births
Nigerian chief executives